Skådalen is a station on the Holmenkollen Line (Line 1) of the Oslo Metro. It is between Midtstuen and Vettakollen. The station was opened on 31 May 1898 as part of the tramway to Besserud.

References

Oslo Metro stations in Oslo
Railway stations opened in 1898
1898 establishments in Norway